Escadron de Transport 43 Médoc is a French Air and Space Force squadron located at Bordeaux–Mérignac Airport, Gironde, France which operates the SOCATA TBM 700 and the Eurocopter Fennec.

See also

 List of French Air and Space Force aircraft squadrons

References

French Air and Space Force squadrons